Eupithecia medilunata is a moth in the family Geometridae. It is found in Kenya.

Subspecies
Eupithecia medilunata medilunata
Eupithecia medilunata crassior D. S. Fletcher, 1958

References

Endemic moths of Kenya
Moths described in 1932
medilunata
Moths of Africa